Edward "Gunboat" Smith (February 17, 1887 – August 6, 1974) was an Irish American boxer, film actor and later a boxing referee. During his career, Smith faced twelve different Boxing Hall of Famers a combined total of 23 times. Among the all-time greats he faced were Jack Dempsey, Harry Greb, Sam Langford, and Georges Carpentier.

Boxing career 

Smith was born in Philadelphia, Pennsylvania. He spent much of his youth in orphanages, working on farms and on the railroads. He joined the U.S. Navy, where he began boxing and won the heavyweight championship of the Pacific Fleet.

In 1910, Smith became known in the Oakland and San Francisco areas by serving as a sparring partner for Jack Johnson and Stanley Ketchel before their heavyweight title fight there. Author Jack London knew Smith and helped fund his training.

From 1912–1915, Smith established himself as a leading candidate for the heavyweight title, beating, among others, British and British Empire champion Bombadier Billy Wells and future world champion Jess Willard, and beating and losing to Sam Langford in two fights. He fought many other ranked fighters, but before his death, Smith was asked to name the greatest fighter he ever met. His response: Langford, in his words, “The best of all of them.”

In 1914, Smith won the "White Hope" heavyweight championship. This title, created by boxing promoters due to the unpopularity of the black heavyweight champion Jack Johnson, was never widely recognized. He lost the "title" to Georges Carpentier later that year in a bout with a purse of 9,000 pounds sterling.

After 1916, Smith's career suffered a decline; in 1917, he suffered a loss by decision to future champion Jack Dempsey in a hotly contested four-round fight. A year later, he was knocked to the canvas 9 times by Dempsey, suffering a one-sided second-round knock out.

In 1920 and 1921, Smith suffered a string of KO losses and retired after suffering a one-round knockout to the great heavyweight contender Harry Wills. He finished with a record of 81 wins, 46 losses, and 13 draws, a total of 140 bouts. “Not a great record on paper,” Dave Allen remarked, “but one that becomes much more impressive when you take into consideration that he fought the very best of his era.”

Smith was lean and scrappy, an excellent boxer who moved well and hit sharply with both hands. Among the men he defeated were Willard, Langford, Wells, Battling Levinsky, Carl Morris, Frank Moran, and Fireman Jim Flynn.

Professional boxing record

| style="text-align:center;" colspan="8"|52 Wins (38 Knockouts), 28 Defeats (12 Knockouts), 10 Draws, 1 No Contest
|-  style="text-align:center; background:#e3e3e3;"
|  style="border-style:none none solid solid; "|Res.
|  style="border-style:none none solid solid; "|Record
|  style="border-style:none none solid solid; "|Opponent
|  style="border-style:none none solid solid; "|Type
|  style="border-style:none none solid solid; "|Rd., Time
|  style="border-style:none none solid solid; "|Date
|  style="border-style:none none solid solid; "|Location
|  style="border-style:none none solid solid; "|Notes
|- align=center
|Loss
|52-28-10
|align=left| Harry Wills
|
|
|
|align=left|
|align=left|
|- align=center
|Loss
|52-27-10
|align=left| Bob Martin
|
|
|
|align=left|
|align=left|
|- align=center
|Loss
|52-26-10
|align=left| Al Roberts
|
|
|
|align=left|
|align=left|
|- align=center
|Loss
|52-25-10
|align=left| Harry Greb
|
|
|
|align=left|
|align=left|
|- align=center
|Loss
|
|align=left| Bob Roper
|
|
|
|align=left|
|align=left|
|- align=center
|style="background:#abcdef;"|Draw
|52-24-10
|align=left| Bob Roper
|
|
|
|align=left|
|align=left|
|- align=center
|Win
|
|align=left| Texas Tate
|
|
|
|align=left|
|align=left|
|- align=center
|Loss
|
|align=left| Chuck Wiggins
|
|
|
|align=left|
|align=left|
|- align=center
|Win
|
|align=left| Tony Melchior
|
|
|
|align=left|
|align=left|
|- align=center
|Loss
|52-24-9
|align=left| Lee Anderson
|
|
|
|align=left|
|align=left|
|- align=center
|Loss
|52-23-9
|align=left| Fred Fulton
|
|
|
|align=left|
|align=left|
|- align=center
|Win
|52-22-9
|align=left| Andre Anderson
|
|
|
|align=left|
|align=left|
|- align=center
|Loss
|51-22-9
|align=left| Bill Tate
|
|
|
|align=left|
|align=left|
|- align=center
|Win
|51-21-9
|align=left| Willie Meehan
|
|
|
|align=left|
|align=left|
|- align=center
|Win
|50-21-9
|align=left|  Carl Morris
|
|
|
|align=left|
|align=left|
|- align=center
|style="background:#abcdef;"|Draw
|49-21-9
|align=left| Ole Anderson
|
|
|
|align=left|
|align=left|
|- align=center
|style="background:#abcdef;"|Draw
|49-21-8
|align=left| Carl Morris
|
|
|
|align=left|
|align=left|
|- align=center
|Win
|49-21-7
|align=left| Fat LaRue
|
|
|
|align=left|
|align=left|
|- align=center
|Loss
|48-21-7
|align=left| Frank Farmer
|
|
|
|align=left|
|align=left|
|- align=center
|Loss
|48-20-7
|align=left| Noel "Boy" McCormick
|
|
|
|align=left|
|align=left|
|- align=center
|Loss
|48-19-7
|align=left| K.O. Kruvosky
|
|
|
|align=left|
|align=left|
|- align=center
|Loss
|48-18-7
|align=left| Jack Dempsey
|
|
|
|align=left|
|align=left|
|- align=center
|Loss
|
|align=left| Billy Miske
|
|
|
|align=left|
|align=left|
|- align=center
|style="background:#abcdef;"|Draw
|48-17-7
|align=left| Tom McMahon
|
|
|
|align=left|
|align=left|
|- align=center
|Loss
|
|align=left| Leo Houck
|
|
|
|align=left|
|align=left|
|- align=center
|Loss
|48-17-6
|align=left| Billy Miske
|
|
|
|align=left|
|align=left|
|- align=center
|Loss
|
|align=left| Clay Turner
|
|
|
|align=left|
|align=left|
|- align=center
|Loss
|
|align=left| Hugh Walker
|
|
|
|align=left|
|align=left|
|- align=center
|Win
|
|align=left| Emmett Kid Wagner
|
|
|
|align=left|
|align=left|
|- align=center
|Loss
|48-16-6
|align=left| Charley Weinert
|
|
|
|align=left|
|align=left|
|- align=center
|Loss
|48-15-6
|align=left| Fred Fulton
|
|
|
|align=left|
|align=left|
|- align=center
|Loss
|48-14-6
|align=left| Jack Dempsey
|
|
|
|align=left|
|align=left|
|- align=center
|Win
|
|align=left| Frank Moran
|
|
|
|align=left|
|align=left|
|- align=center
|Loss
|
|align=left| Kid Norfolk
|
|
|
|align=left|
|align=left|
|- align=center
|Win
|
|align=left| Bill Tate
|
|
|
|align=left|
|align=left|
|- align=center
|style="background:#abcdef;"|Draw
|
|align=left| Kid Norfolk
|
|
|
|align=left|
|align=left|
|- align=center
|Win
|
|align=left| Jack Clifford
|
|
|
|align=left|
|align=left|
|- align=center
|style="background:#abcdef;"|Draw
|
|align=left| Bob McAllister
|
|
|
|align=left|
|align=left|
|- align=center
|Loss
|48-13-6
|align=left| Jack Dillon
|
|
|
|align=left|
|align=left|
|- align=center
|style="background:#abcdef;"|Draw
|48-12-6
|align=left| Jack Moran
|
|
|
|align=left|
|align=left|
|- align=center
|Loss
|
|align=left| Battling Levinsky
|
|
|
|align=left|
|align=left|
|- align=center
|Loss
|
|align=left| Tom Cowler
|
|
|
|align=left|
|align=left|
|- align=center
|Win
|
|align=left| Frank Moran
|
|
|
|align=left|
|align=left|
|- align=center
|Loss
|48-12-5
|align=left| Battling Levinsky
|
|
|
|align=left|
|align=left|
|- align=center
|Win
|
|align=left| Joe Cox
|
|
|
|align=left|
|align=left|
|- align=center
|Win
|
|align=left| Tom Cowler
|
|
|
|align=left|
|align=left|
|- align=center
|Win
|
|align=left| Jim Coffey
|
|
|
|align=left|
|align=left|
|- align=center
|Win
|48-11-5
|align=left| Cleve Hawkins
|
|
|
|align=left|
|align=left|
|- align=center
|Win
|
|align=left| Tom McMahon
|
|
|
|align=left|
|align=left|
|- align=center
|Win
|47-11-5
|align=left| Arthur Pelkey
|
|
|
|align=left|
|align=left|
|- align=center
|Loss
|
|align=left| Battling Levinsky
|
|
|
|align=left|
|align=left|
|- align=center
|Win
|
|align=left| Bob Devere
|
|
|
|align=left|
|align=left|
|- align=center
|Loss
|46-11-5
|align=left| Carl Morris
|
|
|
|align=left|
|align=left|
|- align=center
|Loss
|
|align=left| Dan Flynn
|
|
|
|align=left|
|align=left|
|- align=center
|Loss
|
|align=left| Jack Dillon
|
|
|
|align=left|
|align=left|
|- align=center
|Loss
|46-10-5
|align=left| Jim Coffey
|
|
|
|align=left|
|align=left|
|- align=center
|Win
|
|align=left| Joe Cox
|
|
|
|align=left|
|align=left|
|- align=center
|Loss
|46-9-5
|align=left| Colin Bell
|
|
|
|align=left|
|align=left|
|- align=center
|Win
|
|align=left| Al Reich
|
|
|
|align=left|
|align=left|
|- align=center
|Win
|
|align=left| Sailor Jack Carroll
|
|
|
|align=left|
|align=left|
|- align=center
|Win
|
|align=left| Jack Hemple
|
|
|
|align=left|
|align=left|
|- align=center
|Win
|
|align=left| Tom Cowler
|
|
|
|align=left|
|align=left|
|- align=center
|Loss
|
|align=left| Charley Weinert
|
|
|
|align=left|
|align=left|
|- align=center
|Win
|
|align=left| Dick Gilbert
|
|
|
|align=left|
|align=left|
|- align=center
|Win
|46-8-5
|align=left| Tom McCarty
|
|
|
|align=left|
|align=left|
|- align=center
|Win
|
|align=left| Charley Weinert
|
|
|
|align=left|
|align=left|
|- align=center
|Win
|
|align=left| Jack Reed
|
|
|
|align=left|
|align=left|
|- align=center
|Loss
|
|align=left| Jack Dillon
|
|
|
|align=left|
|align=left|
|- align=center
|Win
|
|align=left| Fireman Jim Flynn
|
|
|
|align=left|
|align=left|
|- align=center
|Win
|45-8-5
|align=left| Battling Levinsky
|
|
|
|align=left|
|align=left|
|- align=center
|style="background:#abcdef;"|Draw
|44-8-5
|align=left| Battling Levinsky
|
|
|
|align=left|
|align=left|
|- align=center
|Win
|44-8-4
|align=left| Chick Carsey
|
|
|
|align=left|
|align=left|
|- align=center
|Win
|43-8-4
|align=left| Tom McCarty
|
|
|
|align=left|
|align=left|
|- align=center
|Win
|
|align=left| Jim Coffey
|
|
|
|align=left|
|align=left|
|- align=center
|Loss
|42-8-4
|align=left| Sam Langford
|
|
|
|align=left|
|align=left|
|- align=center
|Loss
|
|align=left| Battling Levinsky
|
|
|
|align=left|
|align=left|
|- align=center
|Win
|
|align=left| Cyclone Johnny Thompson
|
|
|
|align=left|
|align=left|
|- align=center
|Loss
|42-7-4
|align=left| Georges Carpentier
|
|
|
|align=left|
|align=left|
|- align=center
|Win
|
|align=left| Jack Blackburn
|
|
|
|align=left|
|align=left|
|- align=center
|Win
|42-6-4
|align=left| Arthur Pelkey
|
|
|
|align=left|
|align=left|
|- align=center
|Win
|41-6-4
|align=left| Sam Langford
|
|
|
|align=left|
|align=left|
|- align=center
|Win
|40-6-4
|align=left| Charley Miller
|
|
|
|align=left|
|align=left|
|- align=center
|Win
|39-6-4
|align=left| Tony Ross
|
|
|
|align=left|
|align=left|
|- align=center
|Win
|38-6-4
|align=left| Carl Morris
|
|
|
|align=left|
|align=left|
|- align=center
|Win
|37-6-4
|align=left| Fireman Jim Flynn
|
|
|
|align=left|
|align=left|
|- align=center
|Win
|36-6-4
|align=left| George Rodel
|
|
|
|align=left|
|align=left|
|- align=center
|Win
|35-6-4
|align=left| Jess Willard
|
|
|
|align=left|
|align=left|
|- align=center
|Win
|
|align=left| George Rodel
|
|
|
|align=left|
|align=left|
|- align=center
|Win
|34-6-4
|align=left| Fred McKay
|
|
|
|align=left|
|align=left|
|- align=center
|Win
|33-6-4
|align=left| Bombardier Billy Wells
|
|
|
|align=left|
|align=left|

After boxing 
After his retirement, Smith went on to have a variety of jobs: runner on Wall Street, private policeman at Madison Square Garden and Yankee Stadium, and an actor in several small roles in silent films, including The Great Gatsby and Wings, the first Academy Award-winner for Best Picture.
He also refereed boxing matches, such as the Harry Greb vs. Tiger Flowers middleweight championship bout in 1926 and the controversial Max Schmeling vs. Jack Sharkey return heavyweight championship contest in 1932.

He died in 1974 in Florida.

Partial filmography
Manhattan (1924) - Joe Madden
The Shock Punch (1925) - Terrence O'Rourke
Lovers in Quarantine (1925) - Sailor Sheldon
 The Fear Fighter (1925) - Prison Inmate
Lovers in Quarantine (1925) - Minor Role (uncredited)
Bashful Buccaneer (1925)
Let's Get Married (1926) - Slattery
The Arizona Streak  (1926) - Jim
Say It Again (1926) - Gunner Jones
The Great Gatsby (1926) - Bert
Wings (1927) - The Sergeant
We're All Gamblers (1927) - Gunboat
The City Gone Wild (1927) - Policeman
Midnight Rose (1928) - Casey

References

External links 
 
 

|-

Boxers from Philadelphia
Heavyweight boxers
American male film actors
American male silent film actors
20th-century American male actors
1887 births
1974 deaths
World white heavyweight boxing champions
American male boxers